Arthur Charles Betts (2 January 1886 – 1967) was an English association footballer. He played as a left back in the Football League, most notably Derby County, as well as in the Southern League with Watford. In 1911–12, Betts won the Second Division with Derby.

Career
Born in Scunthorpe, Lincolnshire, Betts started his career at North Lindsey, before joining nearby Football League club Gainsborough Trinity in 1905. During this time he also represented Lincolnshire at county representative level. In 1907 Betts moved south, joining Hertfordshire side Watford of the Southern League, replacing outgoing left back Joe Brooks. Averaging over 30 games per season, he stayed at Watford for three seasons, before returning north for brief spells at Gainsborough Trinity and Newcastle United.

After failing to make Newcastle's first team, Betts transferred to Derby County in October 1911. He featured for Derby regularly, receiving a medal as they won the 1911–12 Football League Second Division, and with it a promotion to the First Division. Betts stayed at Derby until 1914, joining Hull City. Following the First World War, he finished his football career as a player at Scunthorpe & Lindsey United, a player-coach at Normanby Park Steelworks, and a coach at Lysaght Sports.

References

1886 births
1967 deaths
Date of death unknown
Sportspeople from Scunthorpe
Association football defenders
English Football League players
Southern Football League players
Gainsborough Trinity F.C. players
Watford F.C. players
Newcastle United F.C. players
Derby County F.C. players
Hull City A.F.C. players
Scunthorpe United F.C. players
English footballers